The 1991 Country Music Association Awards, 25th Ceremony, was held on September 28, 1991 at the Grand Ole Opry House, Nashville, Tennessee, and was hosted by CMA Award Winner Reba McEntire.

Winners and Nominees 
Winner are in Bold.

Hall of Fame

References 

Country Music Association
CMA
Country Music Association Awards
Country Music Association Awards
Country Music Association Awards
Country Music Association Awards
20th century in Nashville, Tennessee
Events in Nashville, Tennessee